Panampangan Island is an island in the municipality of Sapa-Sapa, Tawi-Tawi. It is considered as the longest sandbar in the Philippines and is characterized with fine white sand beach in the Sulu Archipelago.

See also

 List of islands of the Philippines
 Andulinang Island
 Mardanas Island
 Panguan Island

References

External links

 Panampangan Island at OpenStreetMap

Islands of Tawi-Tawi